Alhaji Alpha Sahid Bakar Kanu is a Sierra Leonean politician and the current Sierra Leone minister of Presidential and Public Affairs. He is also the official spokesman of the All People's Congress (APC) political party, a position he has held even before the APC came to power. In January 2012, Kanu was chosen by Sierra Leone president Ernest Bai Koroma to serve as Minister of Information and Communication in Koroma's new second term cabinet .

Kanu is a close personal friend of president Ernest Bai Koroma; he is also one of the closest and most trusted political advisors to president Koroma.  Kanu is often seen together with president Ernest Bai Koroma in public.

Kanu had served as Sierra Leone Minister of Mines and Natural Resources from  February 27, 2009, before he was moved again to Sierra Leone minister of Presidential and Public Affairs in a Cabinet reshuffled  on December 3, 2010 by president Koroma. Kanu was an elected member of  Sierra Leone House of Parliament representing Port Loko District from 2002 until 2007.

Kanu is a mining engineer by profession. He graduated with a Master of Philosophy (M.Phil) in geophysics from the University of Nottingham in the United Kingdom.

Kanu is a muslim and a member of the Temne ethnic group from Port Loko District in northern Sierra Leone.

Early life and education
Alhaji Alpha Sahid Bakar Kanu was born in Port Loko District in the Northern Province of Sierra Leone of Loko and Temne parentage. Kanu attended the St. Francis Secondary in Makeni and graduated as a Science student. Upon graduation, he attended Fourah Bay College in Freetown and later proceeded to the University of Nottingham in the United Kingdom where he received a Master of Philosophy (M.Phil) in geophysics.

Career
Upon his return to Sierra Leone, Kanu was employed as a mining engineer at the National Diamond Mining Company (NDMC) based in Kono District for about four years, before he proceeded to lecture at the Fourah Bay College in Freetown.

After he left his lecturing profession, Kanu was appointed as head of the department of commercial enterprises where he worked for four years.

Political career
In 2002, Kanu ran for a seat in the Parliament of Sierra Leone from his home district of Port Loko in the 2002 Sierra Leone Parliamentary Election. He won the seat as a member of the opposition All People's Congress (APC). While in Parliament Kanu was one of the fierce critics of Ahmad Tejan Kabbah lead  Sierra Leone People's Party (SLPP) government. Kanu was one of the most senior members of the APC to publicly declare his support for Ernest Bai Koroma during Koroma battle with longtime APC leader Edward Turay for the APC Leadership in 2002. When Koroma was stripped of the APC leadership by the Supreme Court of Sierra Leone in 2005, Kanu spoke against the members of the party that took the case to the supreme court and fought very hard for Koroma to again win the APC leadership. He was the spokesman of the APC, then an opposition party during the 2007 election.

Cabinet positions
When Ernest Bai Koroma was elected president in 2007, Kanu was appointed Minister of Presidential and Public Affairs from October 2007 to February 2009 when he was moved to the Ministry of Mineral Resources. In December 2009, Kanu was again appointed Minister of Presidential and Public Affairs.

External links
https://web.archive.org/web/20160304085344/http://news.sl/drwebsite/exec/view.cgi?archive=5&num=9499
http://www.thepatrioticvanguard.com/spip.php?article3206
http://www.thepatrioticvanguard.com/spip.php?article3808
https://web.archive.org/web/20120326093716/http://crwepicks.com/?tag=alhaji-alpha-kanu

Year of birth missing (living people)
Living people
All People's Congress politicians
Government ministers of Sierra Leone
Sierra Leonean mining engineers
Fourah Bay College alumni
Alumni of the University of Nottingham
Academic staff of Fourah Bay College
People from Port Loko District